The list of ambassadors from Denmark to South Korea began long after diplomatic relations were established in 1902. The official title of this diplomat is "Ambassador of Denmark to the Republic of Korea."

Danish-Korean diplomatic relations were initially established during the Joseon period of Korean history.

After the Denmark-Korea Treaty of 1902 was negotiated, ministers from Denmark could have been appointed in accordance with this treaty. However, diplomatic affairs were initially handled by the Belgian representative in Seoul.

List of heads of mission

Consuls-General 
 Leon Vincart, Belgian Consul-General

Ambassadors
  Lief Donde
  Poul O. G. Hoiness (also ambassador to North Korea)https://wikileaks.org/plusd/cables/10SEOUL207_a.html
  Peter Lysholt Hansen
  Thomas Lehmann (also ambassador to North Korea)

See also
 Denmark-Korea Treaty of 1902
 List of diplomatic missions in South Korea

Notes

References
 Halleck, Henry Wager. (1861).  International law: or, Rules regulating the intercourse of states in peace and war 	New York: D. Van Nostrand. OCLC 852699
 Kim, Chun-gil. (2005). The History of Korea. Westport, Connecticut: Greenwood Press. ; ;  OCLC 217866287
 Korean Mission to the Conference on the Limitation of Armament, Washington, D.C., 1921-1922. (1922). Korea's Appeal to the Conference on Limitation of Armament. Washington: U.S. Government Printing Office. OCLC 12923609

Denmark–South Korea relations
South Korea
Denmark